The loure is a type of bagpipe native to Normandy, popular in the 17th and 18th centuries but later extinct prior to its modern revival.

There was also a larger version known as the haute loure.

References

Bagpipes
French musical instruments
Norman musical instruments